Mir Laiq Ali (died 24 October 1971) was the last Prime Minister of Hyderabad State under the rule of the Nizam, Mir Osman Ali Khan. His official title was "President of the Executive Council of the Nizam of Hyderabad".

Career

Mir Laik Ali was an engineer and an industrialist. He served as the Prime Minister of Hyderabad State from November 1947 until the Operation Polo "police action" of September 1948. During his tenure he struggled to maintain Hyderabad's status as an independent country as a monarchy within the British Commonwealth.

After the defeat of the Hyderabadi defence forces and merger of Hyderabad into the Dominion of India, he was kept under house arrest at his home in Begumpet. In March 1950, he left forever to the Dominion of Pakistan. In Pakistan, he served in the government.

He died in New York on 24 October 1971, while on an official assignment on behalf of Pakistan, and was laid to rest in the holy city of Medina, Saudi Arabia.

See also

 Operation Polo
 Osman Ali Khan, Asif Jah VII

Bibliography

 Tragedy of Hyderabad by Mir Laik Ali

References

External links
 How Hyderabad's Last Premiere fled

20th-century Indian Muslims
Muhajir people
1971 deaths
Prime Ministers of Hyderabad State
1903 births
Hyderabad State independence activists
Indian emigrants to Pakistan